Ernest Edgar Ellis (30 November 1885 – 1 July 1916) was an English professional footballer who played in the Football League for Barnsley as a right back.

Personal life 
Prior to becoming a professional footballer, Ellis worked a machine operator in the bootmaking trade. He served as a private in McCrae's Battalion of the Royal Scots during the First World War. On the first day on the Somme, Ellis went over the top in Sausage Valley and was killed in the attack on La Boisselle. He is commemorated on the Thiepval Memorial.

Career statistics

References

1885 births
1916 deaths
People from Sprowston
English footballers
Association football fullbacks
Norwich City F.C. players
Doncaster Rovers F.C. players
Barnsley F.C. players
Hartlepool United F.C. players
Heart of Midlothian F.C. players
English Football League players
Southern Football League players
Midland Football League players
British Army personnel of World War I
Royal Scots soldiers
Military personnel from Norfolk
British military personnel killed in the Battle of the Somme
Shoemakers
McCrae's Battalion